Landry Heights is a hamlet in northern Alberta, Canada within the Municipal District of Greenview No. 16.

Demographics 
Landry Heights recorded a population of 114 in the 1991 Census of Population conducted by Statistics Canada.

See also 
List of communities in Alberta
List of hamlets in Alberta

References 

Municipal District of Greenview No. 16
Hamlets in Alberta